Hwajeong may refer to:

 Hwajeong-myeon (disambiguation)
 Hwajeong, the 2015 South Korean TV series Splendid Politics
 Hwajeong Museum, Seoul
 Hwajeong station (Goyang)
 Hwajeong station (Gwangju)

See also